Alfonso de Zamora (1474-1544) was a Spanish rabbi who converted to Catholicism in 1506, but remained a secret Jew.

He revised the Hebrew text for Ximenes's Polyglot Bible with Alfonso de Alcalá and Pablo de Coronel, translated the Aramaic paraphrase in it, and added the sixth volume. He published also a work called "Introductiones Hebraicae" (Alcalá, 1526) which included an Epistle to the Hebrews, an open letter to Spanish Jews urging them to convert to Christianity.

Even so, many manuscripts written by or edited by de Zamora, including notes, essays, poems, criticisms, bible commentary, historical records, books, and teaching curriculum were written in Hebrew and included fierce criticism of Christianity, which he called "idolatry"; and Christians in Spain. He also attempted to show the superiority of Judaism.

References

1476 births
1544 deaths
Converts to Roman Catholicism from Judaism
Translators of the New Testament into Hebrew
Jewish translators of the Bible
16th-century Spanish theologians
Conversos
Spanish rabbis